Wooden church may refer to:

Carpathian wooden churches:
Wooden churches of Maramureș, Romania
Wooden churches of the Slovak Carpathians, including three articular churches
Wooden churches of Southern Lesser Poland
Wooden churches in Ukraine
Kizhi Pogost, Kizhi Island, Russia
Wooden Church, Miskolc, Hungary
Wooden Churches Trail, around Puszcza Zielonka Landscape Park, Poland
Churches of Chiloé, wooden churches in southern Chile
Dairthech, a church made of oak-wood common in medieval Ireland
Stave churches

See also
 Wooden churches of Russia, on Russian Wikipedia